Lebeckia is a genus of plants in the family Fabaceae native to the fynbos (Cape Floristic Kingdom) of South Africa. Several members of Lebeckia were recently transferred to other genera (Calobota and Wiborgiella). Members of Lebeckia are known to produce  pyrrolizidine alkaloids, including ammodendrine, lebeckianine, and lupanine. The genus was named by Carl Thunberg for his student Heinrich Julius Lebeck.

Species
Lebeckia comprises the following species:

 Lebeckia ambigua E. Mey.

 Lebeckia brevicarpa M.M.le Roux & B.-E.van Wyk
 Lebeckia brevipes M.M.le Roux & B.-E.van Wyk

 Lebeckia carnosa (E. Mey.) Druce

 Lebeckia contaminata (L.) Thunb.

 Lebeckia densa Thunb.

 Lebeckia gracilis Eckl. & Zeyh.
 Lebeckia grandiflora Benth.

 Lebeckia leucoclada Schltr.

 Lebeckia longipes Bolus

 Lebeckia marginata E. Mey.

 Lebeckia meyeriana Eckl. and Zeyh. ex Harv.

 Lebeckia parvifolia (Schinz) Harms
 Lebeckia pauciflora Eckl. & Zeyh.
 Lebeckia plukenetiana E. Mey.

 Lebeckia schlechteriana Schinz
 Lebeckia sepiaria (L.) Thunb.

 Lebeckia subnuda DC.
 Lebeckia subsecunda Gand.
 Lebeckia uniflora B.-E.van Wyk & M.M.le Roux

 Lebeckia wrightii (Harv.) Bolus
 Lebeckia zeyheri M.M.le Roux & B.-E.van Wyk

Nombina dubia
The validity of the following binomials has not been established:

 Lebeckia aphylla Thunb.
 Lebeckia boureana Benth.
 Lebeckia canescens E.Mey.
 Lebeckia contaminata DC.
 Lebeckia decipiens E.Mey.
 Lebeckia decutiens E.Mey.
 Lebeckia disticha Steud.
 Lebeckia epiaria Thunb.
 Lebeckia flexuosa E.Mey.
 Lebeckia inflata Baker
 Lebeckia linearis DC.
 Lebeckia nuda Sims
 Lebeckia pauciflora Benth. ex Sonder
 Lebeckia pulchella Walp.
 Lebeckia sarcophylloides E.Mey.
 Lebeckia scorpius Thunb.
 Lebeckia sepiaria Benth.
 Lebeckia simsioides Steud.
 Lebeckia subternata Link

References

Crotalarieae
Fabaceae genera
Taxonomy articles created by Polbot